Buji language may refer to:

Boze, a language of Nigeria
Buzi, another name for Ndau (Mozambique)